John J. O'Brien (born November 4, 1888 – December 9, 1967) was an American basketball referee and administrator. Born in Brooklyn, New York, he was involved in organizing several early professional basketball leagues. In 1925, he founded Metropolitan Basketball League, which featured Original Celtics. From 1928 to 1953 he was an executive with American Basketball League, serving as president and, later, as chairman of the board. He was enshrined into the Basketball Hall of Fame as a contributor in 1961.

External links
 Basketball Hall of Fame on O'Brien

1888 births
1967 deaths
Naismith Memorial Basketball Hall of Fame inductees
National Collegiate Basketball Hall of Fame inductees